is the 2nd single by the Japanese idol girl group Onyanko Club. It was released in Japan on October 21, 1985.

Outline 
The song is about a high school girl who nearly flunks her math exam and uses her charm to seduce a male teacher, but refuses to cross the line. The lyrics has been criticized as "justifying child prostitution".

Track listing

Charts

Weekly charts

Year-end charts

References 

Onyanko Club songs
1985 songs
1985 singles
Songs with lyrics by Yasushi Akimoto
Pony Canyon singles